The National Bank of Cambodia (NBC) is the central bank of Cambodia. The bank's duties include, inter alia, the management of monetary and exchange policies, the regulation of banks and financial institutions, and the control of the national currency, the riel. The bank was established in 1954 after the  Indochina Printing Institution closed when Cambodia obtained its independence from France.

During Democratic Kampuchea from 1975 to 1979, the whole financial system ceased to exist, but the central bank was re-established in October 1979. The National Bank of Cambodia was known as the "Red Bank" or "Banque Rouge", and "People's National Bank of Kampuchea" from 1979 to 1992.

History

Creation of a national bank for Cambodia after independence 
The National Bank of Cambodia was established on 23 December 1954, after the country gained its independence from the French Protectorate and after the Institut d’Emission, the printing house for the three Indochinese countries, was closed. At its inception, the bank emitted the national riel currency with a gold standard of a weight of 25.3905 milligrams of fine gold secured by the assets in gold and foreign currencies by the National Bank of Cambodia itself. It thus served an important role as a mixed-economy entreprise of the Sangkum. 

The Cambodian Civil War fragilized the Cambodian banking system and on 28 October 1971, the National Bank ordered the commercial banks to suspend all foreign exchange operations in a vain attempt to establish a "flexible" rate for the riel, which value totally collapsed as the United States dollar became the de facto currency.

Destruction of the Khmer Rouge 
The National Bank of Cambodia was one of the two buildings along with the Cathedral of Phnom Penh which was systematically destroyed by the Khmer Rouge indicated their two main enemies: capitalism and religion. Only ruins remained of the National Bank of Cambodia following the explosion set off by the Khmer Rouge during the fall of Phnom Penh on 17 April 1975.

Creating a bank in a communist regime under Vietnamese occupation 
In an ironic turn of events, the communist regime set up after the Vietnamese invasion in 1979, the People's Republic of Kampuchea, was to reintroduce the use of currency as well as reestablish the capitalist banking system. Since the main office of the National Bank of Cambodia had been demolished by the Khmer Rouge, the temporary head office of the bank was opened on the upper floor of the Khmer Bank of Commerce with credits from the Soviet Union. Through the 1980s, the Central Bank of Cambodia performed both central and commercial bank functions.

Restoration of the monarchy and the national bank to its glory 

In 1990, the gravels that were left from the old building were removed in order to build  a new central bank for Cambodia. Gradually the banking system was strengthened and modernized as democracy and monarchy returned to Cambodia after the 1993 general election. The building was renovated once more in 2003 and is now building new headquarters at the same location.

Cambodia has an integrated sectoral financial sector authority model where the National bank of Cambodia (NBC) is only responsible for the consumer protection and market conduct (CPMC) in the banking industry.

Board of Directors
The governing body of the Central Bank is the Board of Directors. The board consists of seven members: the governor, the deputy governor, and five other members, one representing the head of government, one representing the Ministry of Economy and Finance, one representing economic activities, one representing higher education, and one representing the staff of the Central Bank. The board is headed by the governor.

Branches 
The National Bank of Cambodia has its main headquarters in Phnom Penh as well as 21 branches in various provinces of the country

See also
Cambodian riel
List of banks in Cambodia
Economy of Cambodia
Ministry of Economy and Finance (Cambodia)
Chea Serey

References

Bibliography 

 
 
 

Government of Cambodia
Economy of Cambodia
Cambodia
Banks of Cambodia
1954 establishments in Cambodia
Banks established in 1954
Companies based in Phnom Penh